The Thompson River is a tributary of the Clark Fork in the U.S. state of Montana. It is part of the Columbia River basin, as Clark Fork is a tributary of the Pend Oreille River, which is a tributary of the Columbia River.

The Thompson River is named in honor of David Thompson.

Course
The Thompson River originates in Upper Thompson Lake and flows generally south to join Clark Fork near the town of Thompson Falls.

See also

List of rivers of Montana
Tributaries of the Columbia River

References

Rivers of Montana
Tributaries of the Columbia River
Rivers of Sanders County, Montana